Lumezzane (locally  ) is a town and comune in the province of Brescia, in Lombardy. With a population of 22,255 it is one of the largest towns in the province of Brescia. It is situated in the Gobbia Valley, which is a side valley of the Trompia Valley.

Sports
The local football club of the comune was F.C. Lumezzane V.G.Z. A.S.D. The club was a merger of A.C. Lumezzane and another local side ValGobbiaZanano in 2018.

References

External links

Cities and towns in Lombardy